Cristian Camilo Muñoz Lancheros (born 20 March 1996) is a Colombian cyclist, who currently rides for amateur team .

Major results
2018
 7th Overall Giro Ciclistico d'Italia
1st Stage 8
2020
 10th Time trial, National Road Championships

References

External links

1996 births
Living people
Colombian male cyclists
Sportspeople from Boyacá Department
21st-century Colombian people